JMY may refer to:
 Jangal Mariala railway station, in Pakistan
 JMY Records, an Italian record label
Junction-Mediating and Regulatory Protein, a cofactor for p300 that regulates p53 response